Swamp Devil is a 2008 Canadian horror film directed by David Winning and starring Bruce Dern, Cindy Sampson and Nicolas Wright. It is the 13th film of the Maneater Series.

Plot

Melanie Blaime returns to her hometown of Gibbington, Vermont because her father, a former sheriff, is wanted for multiple murders. Jimmy Fuller wants to help find her father, and it looks as if something incredibly sinister is responsible for the corpses in Gibbington the creature known is swamp devil.

Cast
 Bruce Dern as Howard Blaime
 Cindy Sampson as Melanie Blaime
 Nicolas Wright as Jimmy Fuller
 Robert Higden as Jones
 Allison Graham as Deputy Jolene Harris
 James Kidnie as Sheriff Nelson Bois
 Bronwen Mantel as Shelly
 Kwasi Songui as Bigg
 Mary-Pier Gaudet as Lisa Jones
 Jenna Wheeler-Hughes as Young Dream Girl
 Marc Viger Denis as Young Howard Blaime

Production
The film was completely shot in Montréal, Québec and actor Bruce Dern broke his leg on camera running in the woods, one week into the three-week shoot. He finished the film on crutches and using various photo doubles and camera tricks.

Release
It premiered on April 17, 2008 as part of the Houston Film Festival and was released on DVD by Genius Entertainment on April 7, 2009 with no special features.

Reception
Justin Felix, of DVD Talk, said that if you like your horror cheap and dumb - and don't have access to the Sci-Fi Channel - then this is worth a rental. Michael Simpson, of CinemaSpy, said that the film is a cheesy, predictable but entertaining chiller that isn't likely to scare the pants off anyone in their teens or older and that Winning's direction created enough suspense that such cliches were unnecessary. A Fangoria review says that the film pulls no punches about what it is—a throwaway monster flick that borrows heavily from Swamp Thing and the vine-attack sequence from Evil Dead II.

References

External links

2008 films
Canadian natural horror films
English-language Canadian films
2000s English-language films
Films directed by David Winning
Maneater (film series)
Sonar Entertainment films
Syfy original films
Films set in Vermont
2000s American films
2000s Canadian films